Eupanacra tiridates is a moth of the  family Sphingidae. It is known from the Philippines.

It is similar to Eupanacra regularis regularis, but the postmedian lines on the forewing upperside are less curved. There is a black costal mark, a smaller costal spot and a triangular, white subapical mark present.

References

Eupanacra
Moths described in 1875